Nina Patalon (born 20 January 1986) is a Polish former football midfielder and manager, currently coaching Poland women's national team.

Club career 
In 2002 she began her career at Medyk Konin in the Ekstraliga, where she had played for many years, with an in-between stint at Czarni Sosnowiec. In 2011, due to an injury, she finished her football career as a player.

International career 
During 2004 to 2006 she was a member of the Poland's Youth National Team. In 2009 she represented Poland In a Polish Students Team in the Summer Universiade 2009 in Belgrade.

Managerial career 
After retiring from an active career she began working as a coach. Initially, from 2010, she trained Medyk Konin's young girls team, and in January 2011, with Anna Gawrońska, became the head coach of the Medyk's first team. In 2011 she started helping to coach Poland's U-15 Women National Football Team, and in May 2014 she was appointed to the coaching position of the Poland's U-17 Women National Football Team.

In March 2021 she replaced Miłosz Stępiński as the head coach of the Poland's Women National Team. She is the first woman in the Polish footballing history to hold this position. She made her debut in a friendly match against Sweden, on 13 April 2021.

Personal life 
In 2010 she graduated from the Academy of Physical Education in Poznań where she obtained a class II football coaching license.

Honours

Player

Medyk Konin 
 Ekstraliga runner-up: 2004/05, 2006/07, 2007/08, 2010/11
 Ekstraliga third place: 2003/04, 2008/09
 Polish Cup winner: 2004/05, 2005/06, 2008/09
 Polish Junior Championships winner: 2004, 2005, 2006

Manager

Medyk Konin 
 Ekstraliga runner-up: 2011/12, 2012/13
 Polish Cup runner-up: 2011/12

References 

1986 births
Living people
Polish women's footballers
Medyk Konin players
Female association football managers
People from Działdowo
Women's association football midfielders
Women's national association football team managers
Polish football managers
KKS Czarni Sosnowiec players